Amar Al Tahech (born in December 1986) is a Lebanese singer and actress. After launching her debut single "Naroh Btehreny", she continued her career in the music industry and released her debut studio album titled Helwa.

Discography

Albums 
 Helwa (2010)

Singles

Filmography

Film

TV Series

References

External links 

21st-century Lebanese women singers
Lebanese Muslims
Lebanese pop singers
1986 births
Living people
Singers who perform in Egyptian Arabic